Percival Cale Oliver (1 April 1919 – 9 July 2011) was an Australian backstroke swimmer who competed in the 1936 Summer Olympics.

Oliver was born in Nedlands, Western Australia and attended Hale School.  He won 13 freestyle and backstroke Australian titles.

At the age seventeen he competed at the 1936 Summer Olympics in Berlin, where he finished seventh in the 100-metre backstroke.

Two years later he won gold in the 110-yard backstroke at the 1938 British Empire Games in Sydney. He also won a bronze medal as member of the Australian team in the 3x110-yard medley contest and competed in the 110-yard freestyle.

Oliver went on to teach at Mt Lawley and Hollywood Senior High Schools before taking over the administration of the Education Department's vacation swimming program.

He died on 9 July 2011 at the age of 92.

See also
 List of Commonwealth Games medallists in swimming (men)

References

External links
Percy Oliver's profile at Sports Reference.com
Western Australia's send-off for the 2008 Beijing Olympics
Percy Oliver's obituary

1919 births
2011 deaths
Australian male freestyle swimmers
Australian male backstroke swimmers
Olympic swimmers of Australia
Swimmers at the 1936 Summer Olympics
Swimmers at the 1938 British Empire Games
Commonwealth Games gold medallists for Australia
Commonwealth Games bronze medallists for Australia
Swimmers from Perth, Western Australia
Burials at Karrakatta Cemetery
People educated at Hale School
Commonwealth Games medallists in swimming
20th-century Australian people
Medallists at the 1938 British Empire Games